Selina Jane Griffiths (born 1969) is a British actress mostly known for her performances in sitcoms. She played Pauline Maltby in the ITV comedy series Benidorm. She is the daughter of Annette Crosbie.

Early life
Selina Griffiths is the daughter of Annette Crosbie and Michael Griffiths. She trained at the Central School of Speech and Drama and has appeared in several plays. Having graduated from the Central School of Speech and Drama, she made her professional stage debut at London's Lyric Theatre in The Way of the World alongside Barbara Flynn, with whom she appeared in television's Cranford.

Career
Griffiths has appeared in many television programmes, including Doctor Finlay and Drop the Dead Donkey and playing Janet in The Smoking Room.

In autumn 2007 she co-starred with Deborah Findlay in the BBC1 costume drama series Cranford playing Miss Caroline Tomkinson. In January 2011 she appeared as a frightened passenger in the BBC1 comedy series Come Fly With Me, which is written by Matt Lucas and David Walliams.

In February 2011, she appeared as Pauline in Benidorm, reprising the role in the 2016 & 2018 series and through March–April appeared in the Jeremy Dyson play adaption of Roald Dahl's Twisted Tales.

In March 2012 she appeared as Yvonne Bradshaw in the BBC3 series Being Human.  Later that year she played several roles, including Beatrix Potter, in Sky's Psychobitches (part of Playhouse Presents), appearing in four episodes. She also plays Connie in BBC comedy Cuckoo.

Airing on 26 May 2013, Griffiths appeared in episode 2 (Nobody's Darling) of Case Histories.

In 2014 she appeared in the TV show Jonathan Creek.  In 2015 she appeared as Elspeth Rice in ITV's Midsomer Murders episode 17.4 "A Vintage Murder".

In February 2017 she appeared as a primary school teacher Miss Anstis in the BBC sitcom Not Going Out starring Lee Mack and Sally Bretton. She reprised the role in April 2019.

In January 2019 she appeared as Ruth Thundersby in BBC's Father Brown.

Filmography
 Doctor Finlay "Old Flames" (1995) as Pamela
 The Smoking Room (2004–2006) as Janet, 16 episodes
 Cranford (2007) as Caroline Tomkinson
 Benidorm (2011, 2016–2018) as Pauline Maltby, an alcoholic, 16 episodes
 Holy Flying Circus (2011) as Production Person 2/Personal Assistant to BBC Head of Rude Words
 Playhouse Presents (TV series) "Psychobitches" (2012) as Beatrix Potter/Anna Freud 
 Being Human "Hold the Front Page" (2012) as Yvonne Bradshaw
 Cuckoo (2012–2014, 2018) as Connie, 11 episodes
 Case Histories TV series episode 2 (2013) as Sacha
 Trollied “Christmas Special” (2013) as Helen
 Count Arthur Strong episode 3 "The Radio Play" (2013) as Rachael
 Jonathan Creek “The Sinner and the Sandman” (2014) as Alison Chater
 Midsomer Murders “A Vintage Murder” (2015) as Elspeth Rice
 Not Going Out (2017, 2019) “Charlie”, “Facts of Life” as Miss Anstis
 Quacks “The Bishop’s Appendix”, “The Duke’s Tracheotomy” (2017) as Matron
 Early Man (2018) as Magma
Father Brown “The Passing Bell” (2019) as Ruth Thundersby
Doctors (2019) “Trouble in Mind” as Anna Butler

References

External links

1969 births
Alumni of the Royal Central School of Speech and Drama
English television actresses
English people of Scottish descent
Living people
People from Richmond, London
Actresses from Surrey
20th-century English actresses
21st-century English actresses